Colunga is a municipality in the Autonomous community of the Principality of Asturias, Spain. It lies on the Cantabrian Sea, and is bordered to the west by Villaviciosa, to the south by Parres and Piloña, and to the east by Caravia.

Politics

Parishes

Parish of Colunga
The capital of the municipality is the parish with the same name. Its population is 1,132 (INE 2007) and it is divided in five villages: Cimavilla, El Ferreru, Friera, Loreto and El Sorriberu.

Demography

Anchovy beaching incident
On September 29, 2006, millions of anchovies, constituting a weight of over three tons, had beached themselves near Colunga. Tests on the dead fish did not detect any toxic chemical that could have caused the beaching, and the current working theory is that the shoal beached itself trying to escape from "hungry dolphins or tuna." If the beached specimens had grown to maturity, it would have been more than "100 tons of potential breeders."

Gallery

Notes

References 
Populationsdata INE
Postalcodes 
Altitdude Google Earth

External links

www.llastres.com | foros de lastres 
Federación Asturiana de Concejos 
Portal sobre el concejo 
14 rutas por colunga 

Municipalities in Asturias